Soup is a collaborative album by Bill Laswell, Yasuhiro Yoshigaki and Otomo Yoshihide. It was released on December 10, 2003 by P-Vine Records.

Track listing

Personnel 
Adapted from the Soup liner notes.
Musicians
Bill Laswell – bass guitar, sampler, effects, mixing
Yasuhiro Yoshigaki – drums, percussion, electronic drums (1), trumpet (4)
Otomo Yoshihide – guitar, turntables (2, 4), editing
Technical personnel
James Dellatacoma – assistant engineer
Chikara Iwai – design
Michael Fossenkemper – mastering
Yoshiaki Kondo – recording
Robert Musso – engineering
Shin Terai – producer

Release history

References

External links 
 Soup at Bandcamp
 

2003 albums
Collaborative albums
Bill Laswell albums
Otomo Yoshihide albums
Albums produced by Shin Terai
P-Vine Records albums